The Radford Highlanders women's basketball team represents Radford University in NCAA Division I intercollegiate women's basketball competition. They are a member of the Big South Conference.

History
Radford began play in 1971. As of the end of the 2016–17 season, the Highlanders have an all-time record of 707–868–5. They have won six regular season titles and nine conference titles. They have appeared in the NCAA Tournament four times (1994, 1995, 1996, 2019) and the WNIT four times (1989, 2008, 2015, 2017).

NCAA tournament results

References

External links